The Italian regional elections of 1995  were held on April 23. These regional elections were the first ones that were held with the new electoral law called "Tatarellum" (from the name of its rapporteur, Giuseppe Tatarella).

The centre-left coalition won in nine regions, while the centre-right coalition won in only six regions.

Tatarella law
A new electoral law for ordinary Regions of Italy was adopted in 1995, replacing the 1970 original one, in aim to abolish PR and its political instability. If 80% of the seats continued to be chosen with the old PR through provincial lists, the 20% was assigned at large though block voting to the best regional coalition of parties. Direct presidential elections were postponed to 2000 needing a reform of the Constitution of Italy, but in the North the leaders were de facto elected presidents for five years, while in the South political instability continued as usual.

Coalitions
After the fall of the Berlusconi I Cabinet, and the consequent collapse of the Pole of Freedoms, the Northern League became a single party while a new national centre-right coalition was formed with a split of the Italian People's Party. The remaining of the PPI joined the new centre-left coalition, The Olive Tree, which was consequently abandoned by the Communist Refoundation Party for protest.

Overall results

Regional councils

Presidents of the regions

Results by region

Piedmont

Lombardy

Veneto

Liguria

Emilia-Romagna

Tuscany

Umbria

Marche

Lazio

Abruzzo

Molise

Campania

Basilicata

Apulia

Calabria

External links
Ministry of the Interior – Electoral Archive

Elections in Italian regions
1995 elections in Italy
April 1995 events in Europe